Harald-Otto Mors (18 November 1910 – 11 February 2001) was a Wehrmacht officer (1934–1945) during the Second World War. In the summer of 1943 he commanded a battalion of Fallschirmjäger and planned and led the Gran Sasso raid to rescue Benito Mussolini following his arrest in September 1943. He received the German Cross in Gold on 26 September 1943. He became a Bundeswehr officer from 1955 until his retirement in 1965.

Mors played a key role in planning the raid, and participated as commander of the secondary force that secured the lower cable-car station at the foot of the Gran Sasso mountain as the airborne raid was underway at the mountain top, where Mussolini was held.

References

Citations

Bibliography

 Patricelli, Marco. Liberate il Duce! La vera storia dell'Operazione Quercia, Mondadori, Milano 2001 / ried. Hobby & Work, Milano 2012, .
 Annussek, G. Hitler's Raid To Save Mussolini'', Da Capo Press, 2005. 
 

1910 births
2001 deaths
Fallschirmjäger of World War II
Recipients of the Gold German Cross
Luftwaffe personnel of World War II